Innocent Hamga (born May 8, 1981) is a Cameroonian former professional footballer who played as a defender.

International career
Hamga holds 22 games for Cameroon and 2 goals. He was member at 2000 African Cup of Nations in Ghana and Nigeria. He played four games at 1999 FIFA World Youth Championship.

Honours

Club
Cotonsport Garoua
 Cameroon League Champion: 1998, 1999

International
Cameroon U21
 U-21 Africa-Cup runners-up: 1999

Cameroon
 African Cup of Nations: 2000

External links
 
 
 

1981 births
Living people
Association football defenders
Cameroonian footballers
Cameroonian expatriate footballers
Cameroon under-20 international footballers
Cameroon international footballers
2000 African Cup of Nations players
Coton Sport FC de Garoua players
FC Martigues players
RCD Espanyol footballers
Olympique de Marseille players
Thonon Evian Grand Genève F.C. players
SO Cassis Carnoux players
La Liga players
Ligue 2 players
Expatriate footballers in Spain
Cameroonian expatriate sportspeople in Poland